Valeria Mihailovna Sorokina (born 29 March 1984) is a badminton player from Russia. Together with her doubles partner Nina Vislova, she is the first Russian Olympic medalist in badminton.

Career
She won the gold medal at the 2010 European Badminton Championships and bronze medals in 2008 and 2012 in women's doubles with Nina Vislova. In her home country Russia she won seven  national titles before 2013.

Achievements

Olympic Games 
She played in women's doubles discipline with Nina Vislova and finished in third place after winning bronze medal match against Canadian women's doubles players, Bruce and Li with 21-9, 21-10.

Women's doubles

European Championships
Women's Doubles

European Junior Championships
Girls' Doubles

Mixed Doubles

BWF Grand Prix 
The BWF Grand Prix has two level such as Grand Prix and Grand Prix Gold. It is a series of badminton tournaments, sanctioned by Badminton World Federation (BWF) since 2007. The World Badminton Grand Prix sanctioned by International Badminton Federation since 1983.

Women's Doubles

Mixed Doubles

 BWF Grand Prix Gold tournament
 BWF Grand Prix tournament

BWF International Challenge/Series
Women's doubles

Mixed doubles

 BWF International Challenge tournament
 BWF International Series tournament

References

External links 
 
 
 

1984 births
Living people
Sportspeople from Nizhny Novgorod
Russian female badminton players
Badminton players at the 2012 Summer Olympics
Olympic badminton players of Russia
Olympic bronze medalists for Russia
Olympic medalists in badminton
Medalists at the 2012 Summer Olympics